Joseph Wilbur Adcock (October 30, 1927 – May 3, 1999) was an American professional baseball player and manager. He played in Major League Baseball as a first baseman from 1950 to 1966, most prominently as a member of the Milwaukee Braves teams that won two consecutive National League pennants and won the 1957 World Series. 

Adcock ranks third in Milwaukee Braves history in hits, home runs, runs batted in and total bases. A sure-handed defensive player, at the time of his retirement in 1966, he had the third-highest career fielding percentage by a major league first baseman (.994). During his major league tenure, he also played for the Cincinnati Reds, Cleveland Indians and the Los Angeles / California Angels. 

His nickname "Billy Joe" was modeled after Vanderbilt University basketball star "Billy Joe Adcock" and was popularized by Vin Scully. Adcock was inducted into the Braves Hall of Fame in 2022.

Early life
Born in Coushatta, Louisiana, Adcock attended Louisiana State University in Baton Rouge, where he played on the baseball team; before attending college he had never played a game of baseball in his life.

Playing career
He was signed by the Cincinnati Reds, however Ted Kluszewski had a firm hold on the team's first base slot. Adcock played in left field from 1950 to 1952, but was extremely unhappy, demanding a trade, which he received.

His first season with the Milwaukee Braves was capped by a mammoth home run into the center-field bleachers at the Polo Grounds on April 29, 1953, a feat which had never been done before and would only be accomplished twice more, by Hank Aaron and Lou Brock.

Of note, the four home runs were hit off four different Brooklyn Dodgers pitchers, becoming the seventh player in major league history to hit four home runs in one game.

Another notable home run was the blast ending the epic duel between Lew Burdette and Harvey Haddix on May 26, 1959, in which Haddix took a perfect game into the 13th inning. Adcock did not get credit for a home run, however, because Aaron – who was on first base – saw Félix Mantilla, the runner ahead of him, score the winning run and thought the hit had only been a double and walked back to the dugout, causing Adcock to be called out for passing him on the base paths. (Eventually, the ruling was that instead of a 3-run home run for a 3–0 Braves victory, Adcock got a double and 1 RBI, and the Braves won 1–0.)

Adcock was often overshadowed both by his own teammates Aaron and Eddie Mathews, and by the other slugging first basemen in the league, Kluszewski and Gil Hodges, although he did make one All-Star team (1960) and was regularly among the league leaders in home runs. In , he finished second in the National League in home runs, runs batted in, and slugging average.

Pitcher Sal Maglie said of Adcock, "Pitch Adcock close and then low and away and he'll never hit."

Managerial career
After concluding his playing career with the Cleveland Indians (1963) and Los Angeles/California Angels (1964–1966), Adcock managed the Indians for one year (1967), with the team registering its worst percentage finish in 21 years (.463, vs. .442 in 1946), finishing eighth in a ten-team league.  Following the season he was replaced as Cleveland manager by Alvin Dark.  Adcock managed two more years in the minor leagues before settling down at his  ranch in Coushatta to raise horses.

Managerial record

Death
He later died in Coushatta at age 71 in 1999 as a result of Alzheimer's disease. He is buried in Social Springs cemetery in Red River parish,  from Coushatta.

See also
 List of Major League Baseball career home run leaders
 List of Major League Baseball career runs batted in leaders
 List of Major League Baseball single-game home run leaders

References

External links

Joe Adcock at SABR (Baseball BioProject)

1927 births
1999 deaths
American men's basketball players
American racehorse owners and breeders
Baseball coaches from Louisiana
Baseball players from Louisiana
California Angels players
Cincinnati Reds players
Cleveland Indians managers
Cleveland Indians players
Columbia Reds players
Deaths from Alzheimer's disease
Los Angeles Angels players
LSU Tigers baseball players
LSU Tigers basketball players
Major League Baseball first basemen
Milwaukee Braves players
Minor league baseball managers
National League All-Stars
Deaths from dementia in Louisiana
People from Coushatta, Louisiana
Tulsa Oilers (baseball) players